SM Shafiul Azam (1923–4 December 1991) was a Pakistani and Bangladeshi civil servant.

Biography

Azam graduated with a degree in Law and English from the University of Dhaka. From 1948 to 1949, Azam taught English literature at Dhaka College. He successfully stood for the Central Superior Services of Pakistan. 

In 1969 Azam became the first Bengali chief secretary of East Pakistan. After the Independence of Bangladesh, he found himself out of favor with the new government. After the government changed he went on to become Deputy Secretary and cabinet secretary. He served as the Deputy of the Bangladesh Planning Commission. He served as the Minister of Communication, Industry, Jute, and Mineral Resources in the Cabinet of President Ziaur Rahman.

Azam died on 4 December 1991.

References

1991 deaths
Textiles and Jute ministers of Bangladesh
Road Transport and Bridges ministers of Bangladesh
Power, Energy and Mineral Resources ministers
Bangladeshi civil servants
Pakistani civil servants
Academic staff of Dhaka College
University of Dhaka alumni
1923 births